Galina Georgievna Tsareva (born 19 April 1950) is a retired Soviet sprint cyclist who dominated the UCI Track Cycling World Championships of 1969-1980, winning 6 gold, 1 silver and 1 bronze medals. Between 1969 and 1987 she won at least 10 national titles. She had an unusually long cycling career and was a candidate for the 1988 Olympic team, when women's track cycling was first introduced to the Olympics.

She married cycling coach Aleksandr Kuznetsov, they have three children. Nikolai (b. 1973) is a Russian cyclist who won a silver medal at the 1996 Olympics; Aleksei is also a competitive cyclist, whereas Svetlana (b. 1985) is a prominent Russian tennis player.

Major Results

1969
 UCI World Championships
 1st  Sprint
1970
 UCI World Championships
 1st  Sprint
1971
 UCI World Championships
 1st  Sprint

1974
 UCI World Championships
 3rd  Sprint
1977
 UCI World Championships
 1st  Sprint
1978
 UCI World Championships
 1st  Sprint

1979
 UCI World Championships
 1st  Sprint
1980
 UCI World Championships
 2nd  Sprint
1987
 3rd Paris, Sprint
1989
 1st Paris, Sprint

References

1950 births
Living people
Soviet female cyclists
UCI Track Cycling World Champions (women)
Russian track cyclists
People from Velikiye Luki
Sportspeople from Pskov Oblast